Vladimir Ilyich Yashchenko or Volodymyr Yashchenko (12 January 1959 – 30 November 1999) was a Ukrainian member of the Soviet national team and former world record holder in the high jump (233 cm, 234 cm and 235 cm).

He first broke the record at age 18 with a jump of 2.33 m, at the USA-USSR junior dual meet in Richmond, Virginia, 1977. He won the 1978 European Championships high jump competition with a jump of 230 cm.  On 12 March 1978 he achieved the highest mark using the straddle technique.

In 1979 he suffered a severe knee injury and his career was effectively over at the age of 20. Yashchenko died from cirrhosis at the age of 40.

References

External links

1959 births
1999 deaths
Soviet male high jumpers
Honoured Masters of Sport of the USSR
World record setters in athletics (track and field)
Sportspeople from Zaporizhzhia
Deaths from cirrhosis
European Athletics Championships medalists